Canistropsis is a genus of plants in the family Bromeliaceae, subfamily Bromelioideae.

The genus name is from the genus Canistrum and the Greek “opsis” (resembling).

All 11 species of this genus are endemic to the Atlantic Forest biome (Mata Atlantica Brasileira), located in southeastern Brazil.

Species 
Species of the genus according to Plants of the World Online :

References

External links
FCBS Canistropsis photos
BSI Genera Gallery photos

 
Endemic flora of Brazil
Flora of the Atlantic Forest
Bromeliaceae genera